John Christopher Vukovich (July 31, 1947 – March 8, 2007), nicknamed "Vuk" or "Johnny Vuk", was an American professional baseball utility infielder, manager, and coach in Major League Baseball, best known for his years with the Philadelphia Phillies. Vukovich is also known for recording the lowest career MLB batting average (BA) (.161) of any non-pitcher with 500 or more at bats (AB).

Personal life

Vukovich was of Serbian descent and was born in Sacramento, California and grew up in Sutter Creek, California.  His father was the baseball coach for the local Amador High School where Vukovich attended.

Baseball career

Player

Vukovich was traded along with Don Money and Bill Champion by the Phillies to the Brewers for Jim Lonborg, Ken Brett, Ken Sanders and Earl Stephenson on October 31, 1972. He was a backup for the 1975 Reds World Series-winning team, although he was traded back to the Phillies before the playoffs began, and also for the 1980 Phillies World Series-winning team. He actually began the 1975 season as the Reds' starting third baseman, but was benched in early April after hitting only .250 with three extra base hits and only one RBI.  The Reds moved Pete Rose to third base and platooned Dan Driessen and George Foster in left at first, but Foster eventually won the left-field job full time.  Vukovich spent the remainder of his time with the Reds as a late-inning defensive replacement before being released in May 1975.  

He batted above .200 only twice in his ten-year career, appearing in 277 games hitting 6 home runs, with 44 runs batted in, and a career .956 fielding percentage. His career batting average was .161, the lowest in Major League Baseball history for any batter (non-pitcher) with over 550 plate appearances.

During his second period of playing with the Phillies, he became beloved to the fans even though he seldom appeared in games; he was seen as a blue-collar player and the ordinary fan respected his effort.

Coaching
After his playing career ended, he joined the Chicago Cubs as a coach, and in  he was manager for a day after Jim Frey was fired (he split that day's doubleheader). In , he rejoined the Phillies, and after Lee Elia was fired with nine games to go, he took over as skipper, going 5-4 the rest of the season.

The job eventually went to Vukovich's childhood friend, Larry Bowa. Vukovich was diagnosed with a brain tumor early in the  season and subsequently had surgery. He would return later that season, and remained on the coaching staff until being named special assistant to the General manager following the  season. Along with Bowa and Milt Thompson, Vukovich is one of just three Phillies to go to the World Series as both a player and coach for the club.

Death
In late 2006, he again exhibited symptoms similar to his previous tumor; he died at Thomas Jefferson University Hospital in Philadelphia at age 59. The 2007 Phillies honored him by wearing a uniform patch on their right sleeve with his nickname, "Vuk". At the time of his passing, Vukovich was a resident of Voorhees Township, New Jersey.

References

External links

John Vukovich at SABR (Baseball BioProject)
John Vukovich at Baseball Almanac
John Vukovich at Baseball Biography
John Vukovich at The Deadball Era

Curt Schilling's Tribute to John Vukovich

         

1947 births
2007 deaths
Deaths from brain cancer in the United States
Major League Baseball third basemen
Major League Baseball bench coaches
Major League Baseball first base coaches
Major League Baseball hitting coaches
Major League Baseball third base coaches
Philadelphia Phillies players
Eugene Emeralds players
Reading Phillies players
Huron Phillies players
Oklahoma City 89ers players
Toledo Mud Hens players
Indianapolis Indians players
Tidewater Tides players
Spartanburg Phillies players
Milwaukee Brewers players
Cincinnati Reds players
Baseball players from Sacramento, California
Chicago Cubs managers
Philadelphia Phillies coaches
Philadelphia Phillies managers
People from Voorhees Township, New Jersey
American people of Serbian descent
American River Beavers baseball players
Deaths from cancer in Pennsylvania
Chicago Cubs coaches
Sportspeople from the Delaware Valley